The 1982 San Jose mayoral election was held on June 8, 1982 to elect the mayor of San Jose, California. Tom McEnery was elected. Because McEnrery won an outright majority in the initial round of the election, no runoff election needed to be held.

Incumbent mayor Janet Gray Hayes was term limited.

Candidates
Claude Fletcher, member of the San Jose City Council since 1980 and Republican nominee for the California State Assembly district 24 in 1976
Tom McEnery, member of the San Jose City Council and former chairman of the San Jose Planning Commission
Tom Tomasko

Results

References

San Jose
San Jose
1982